Bagh Dehuk (also Romanized as Bāgh Dehūk and Bāgh-e Dehūk; also known as Bāgh-e Dohok) is a village in Khvormiz Rural District, in the Central District of Mehriz County, Yazd Province, Iran. At the 2006 census, its population was 141, in 44 families.

References 

Populated places in Mehriz County